Jan Eric Anton Larsson (born 15 July 1991) is a Swedish professional footballer who plays as a right-back for Super League Greece club OFI.

Career

GIF Sundsvall
Eric Larsson played five seasons for GIF Sundsvall. In 2017 he earned a nomination for Allsvenskan defender of the year.

Malmö FF
After the expiration of Larsson's contract with GIF Sundsvall, it was announced on 9 November 2017 that he had signed a four-year contract with Swedish champions Malmö FF.

Career statistics
As of 8 December 2021.

Honours

Malmö FF
Allsvenskan: 2020, 2021
Svenska Cupen: 2021–22

References

External links

1991 births
Living people
Association football defenders
Gefle IF players
GIF Sundsvall players
Malmö FF players
OFI Crete F.C. players
Allsvenskan players
Superettan players
Super League Greece players
Sweden youth international footballers
Swedish footballers
Swedish expatriate footballers
Swedish expatriate sportspeople in Greece
Expatriate footballers in Greece
People from Gävle
Sportspeople from Gävleborg County